Juice is the soundtrack to the 1992 crime drama film of the same name. It was released on December 31, 1991, through MCA Records and consisted mainly of hip hop music. The soundtrack was a success, making it to #17 on the Billboard 200 and #3 on the Top R&B Albums and featured four charting singles "Uptown Anthem", "Juice (Know the Ledge)", "Don't Be Afraid" and "Is It Good to You".

Track listing

Charts

Weekly charts

Year-end charts

Certifications

References

1991 soundtrack albums
Thriller film soundtracks
Contemporary R&B soundtracks
Hip hop soundtracks
Albums produced by DJ Muggs
Albums produced by Erick Sermon
Albums produced by Eric B.
Albums produced by Teddy Riley
MCA Records soundtracks